Raasta (Hindi: "The Way") may refer to:

Film
Raasta (1989 film), List of Bollywood films of 1989
Raasta (2003 film) (Bengali: রাস্তা "The Route"), Bengali film	
Raasta (2014 film), List of Odia-language films and 6th Tarang Cine Awards
Raasta (2017 film) (Urdu: راستہ "The Way"), Pakistani Action/Drama film directed by Saqib Siddiqui

See also
Rasta (disambiguation)
Raasta Man sixth studio album by Lucky Ali 2011
Raasta roko (Hindi: "obstruct the road") form of protest commonly practised in India
Naya Raasta (Hindi: The New Road) 1970 Bollywood drama film